Gerald Auger (born March 20, 1978) is a Canadian actor, producer, writer, entrepreneur and motivational speaker of Woodland Cree descent. He graduated from Grande Prairie Regional College in 1995 with a Marketing Management diploma and a Small Business Management certificate. He also became president of the campus’ Student Association, president of the Student Society for Alberta Vocational College and the Circle of Aboriginal Students, and received the Charles S. Noble Student Leadership Award from the Department of Advanced Education and the Province of Alberta.

In 1996 and 1997 Auger was awarded the National Native Role Model by the Governor General of Canada and spent the next two years visiting more than 30 communities across Canada, inspiring his aboriginal peers, relating stories about his experiences and bonding with locals through cultural events and ceremonies. Auger is the first aboriginal recipient of the Rotary International Integrity Award for the Avenue of Nations in Alberta.

After being spotted at the opening ceremonies of the 1995 Canada Winter Games, Auger was given a supporting role in the 1998 film Il mio West (later dubbed Gunslinger’s Revenge), also starring David Bowie and Harvey Keitel. Filmed in Italy for Pacific Pictures, it was the first Spaghetti Western to use First Nations actors in aboriginal roles.

In 1999 Auger became the first aboriginal recipient of the Rotary International Integrity Award for the Avenue of Nations in Alberta.

Auger had a lead role in the 2002 National Geographic IMAX-production Lewis & Clark: Great Journey West, and the next year he played Crow Hunter in an episode of the four-part Hallmark Entertainment TV miniseries Dreamkeeper.

In 2005 Auger had the supporting lead of Soaring Eagle in the first episode of the Steven Spielberg’s DreamWorks-produced six-part miniseries Into the West; in 2006 he completed the film Klatsassin with Stan Douglas; and in 2007 he was cast as Chief Ambrose McQuinna in the CTV-produced Luna: Spirit of the Whale with Adam Beach, Graham Greene, Tantoo Cardinal and Jason Priestley of Beverly Hills, 90210.

In addition to being in the opening and closing ceremonies for the Arctic Winter Games as Anook the Rockman for The Heroes Journey in 2010, Auger had a role in the cult classic FUBAR 2 and played a Native guide and interpreter in Western Confidential (starring FUBAR’s Paul Spence) as well as a Native policeman in The Plateau.

In 2011 Auger had a cameo on primetime series Blackstone and landed the lead role of Pawnee Killer who represents the Indian resistance in Entertainment One's historical western drama Hell on Wheels, directed by David Von Ancken and filmed in Calgary.

Auger produced, wrote and directed the 2007 short film Walking Alone about the life of rapper Shawn Bernard, and the 2008 National Film Board of Canada documentary Honour Thy Father that tells the story of his conflict with the Anglican Church (which refused his late father to have a traditional native funeral), and won Best Film Representing Cultural Diversity at the Alberta Motion Picture Industry Awards in 2009.

In 2012 he wrote and produced the series The Ancients for Aboriginal Peoples Television Network and worked on the sequel to his film Honour Thy Father—Our Journey Home, which deals with Christianity and Native spirituality in Indian country. He was also cast in the soon-to-be filmed Scattered Leaves: Legend of the Ghostkiller and the horror movie The Silent Darkness—The Rise of The Witch.

Auger has been featured in commercials for Pfizer Pharmaceuticals in Los Angeles and a South Korean car commercial for Magnus.

As owner and Chief Executing Officer of the business Black Eagle Entertainment, Auger aims to produce films, television series and documentaries aiming to advance the status and expose the stereotyping of his people.

In 2013, Auger worked on his latest film project Jesus in the Lodge – The Forgotten Truth of the Wilderness where he explored the idea that the Son of God was the first Sundancer, for he was one of the first men to give his flesh to a tree.

Auger had a busy fall in 2015, with roles in three short films. In October, he flew to St. Petersburg, Russia to film Petersburg. A Selfie, a collection of seven stories by director Natalia Kudryashova. The theme is Russia’s most beautiful city seen through the perspective of seven women on the concept of love. Anichkov Bridge is one of the stories in which Auger plays a modern-day Native American with a rock star style, making cinematic history as the first indigenous actor to shoot a film in Russia. In Bohemian Blood, an independent short film he produced for The Frightening 48 Hour Film Challenge, Auger’s role is an indigenous cult leader of murderous artist hookers who use hammers to kill their Johns in a bohemian-style brothel. In December, he will be cast in Australian production Lost Face, a classic story by Jack London that takes place in mid-1800s Russia.

Film
 Il mio West (1998) – Native warrior
 Lewis & Clark: Great Journey West (2002) – Shoshone chief
 Klatsassin (2006)
 Murder Inc.
 Luna: Spirit of The Whale (2007) – Chief Ambrose McQuinna
 FUBAR 2 (2010)
 Alone (2010) – Native policeman
 The Plateau (2010) – Mike Cardinal
 Western Confidential (2011) – Native guide and interpreter
 Anichkov Bridge (2015) – Modern-day Native in Russia

Television
 Be Aware
 North of 60
 The Long Walk
 Stories from the 7th Fire
 How the Fiddle Flows (2002)
 Dreamkeeper (2003) – Crow Hunter
 Into the West (2005) – Soaring Eagle
 Blackstone (2011) – Dan Brown
 Hell on Wheels (2011, 2012) – Cheyenne Brave Pawnee Killer

Video Short
 Higher Ground (2011) – Komonake

Docudrama/Industrial
 I Am Alcohol
 Crimestoppers
 I Will Not Cry Alone
 Dream Makers (2006)

Voice-over roles
 Cree 10/20/30
 Blanket of Silence
 Stories from the 7th Fire

Theatre
 Canada Winter Games opening ceremonies (1995) – performer
 Canada Winter Games opening and closing ceremonies (2010) – Anook the Rockman
 National Aboriginal Achievement Awards

Filmmaking
 Walking Alone (2007) – film
 Honour Thy Father (2008) – documentary
 Jesus in the Lodge – The Forgotten Truth of the Wilderness (2013) – documentary
 Bohemian Blood (2015) – short film

References

External links
 
 www.geraldauger.ca

1968 births
Living people
Canadian male film actors
Canadian male television actors
Film producers from Alberta
First Nations male actors
Male actors from Alberta
First Nations filmmakers
Cree people